The Invisible is a 2020 Spanish drama film directed by Gracia Querejeta starring Emma Suárez, Adriana Ozores and Nathalie Poza.

Plot 
Set in a public park, the plot concerns the conversations established between three women close to their 50s (Elsa, Julia and Amelia) on their weekly walks around the site.

Cast

Production 

The screenplay was penned by Gracia Querejeta alongside Antonio Santos Mercero. Invisibles was produced by Nephilim Producciones SL and Orange Films AIE with the participation of RTVE, RTVM and Movistar+, endorsement from Canal Extremadura and support from ICAA and Junta de Extremadura. The film was primarily shot on location in the Parque del Príncipe in Cáceres (with some footage shot in a nearby street and high school) from March to April 2019, only using a steadycam.

Release 
Distributed by Wanda Films, Invisibles was theatrically released in Spain on 6 March 2020 grossing a "good" 136,761 € in its opening weekend standing out from a domestic box office otherwise depressed due to the growth of COVID-19 cases, but its theatrical run was soon halted by the State of Alarm declared by the Government due to the pandemic, which closed theatres down.

Accolades 

|-
| align = "center" rowspan = "5" | 2021 || rowspan = "5" | 76th CEC Medals || Best Director || Gracia Querejeta ||  || rowspan = "5" | 
|-
| rowspan = "2" | Best Actress || Emma Suárez || 
|-
| Adriana Ozores || 
|-
| Best Supporting Actor || Pedro Casablanc || 
|-
| Best Original Screenplay || Antonio Mercero, Gracia Querejeta || 
|}

See also 
 List of Spanish films of 2020

References

External links 
 Invisibles at ICAA's Catálogo de Cinespañol

2020 films
Films shot in the province of Cáceres
2020 drama films
Spanish drama films
2020s Spanish-language films
Films set in parks
Films directed by Gracia Querejeta
2020s Spanish films